Percy Edward Lawrie (12 December 1902 — 2 February 1988) was an English first-class cricketer.

Education and first-class cricket
The son of Major-General Charles Lawrie, he was born at Kensington in December 1902. He was educated at Eton College, where he played for the college cricket team. After success in the Eton v Harrow of 1921, Lawrie made his debut in first-class cricket for Hampshire against Glamorgan in the 1921 County Championship at Southampton. After leaving Eton, he matriculated to Balliol College, Oxford. He was a member of the Oxford University Cricket Club, but failed to initially gain a place in the Oxford team after failing in a trial match in 1922. However, a half century for Hampshire against Oxford University later that season secured him a further trial, with him making two first-class appearances for Oxford in 1922, against the Free Foresters and Lancashire. He featured for Hampshire during the summer holiday, making four first-class appearances in the 1922 County Championship. The following year he made two further first-class appearances for Oxford, and did so once again in 1924. Lawrie failed to gain a Blue during his studies at Oxford, largely in part due to a strong Oxford batting line-up limiting his first team appearances. 

He continued to play first-class cricket for Hampshire until 1928, making a total of 28 appearances for the county. Described by Wisden as a "particularly fine off-driver", he scored 959 runs for Hampshire at an average of 22.30; he made four half centuries and one century, which was a score of 107 against Leicestershire in 1923, which was made in under two hours and helped Hampshire to avoid defeat. For Oxford University, he scored 125 runs at an average of 15.62, with a highest score of 39. Lawrie died in February 1988 at Teignmouth Hospital in Teignmouth, Devon.

References

External links

1902 births
1988 deaths
Cricketers from the Royal Borough of Kensington and Chelsea
People educated at Eton College
Alumni of Balliol College, Oxford
English cricketers
Hampshire cricketers
Oxford University cricketers